The 2016 World of Outlaws Craftsman Sprint Car Series season was the 38th season of the winged sprint car series in North America. The season began with the DIRTcar Nationals at Volusia Speedway Park on February 12, and ended with the Bad Boy Off Road World of Outlaws World Finals at The Dirt Track at Charlotte on October 29. Donny Schatz entered the season as the defending series champion, and won the 2017 championship, his eighth overall.

Full-time teams and drivers

Schedule/Results

 - ≠ will state if the race was postponed or canceled
 - ≈ will state if the race is not for championship points

Schedule notes and changes
 - the July 29th race at Hartford Speedway was postponed to September 21 due to weather
 - the Rock N' Roll Gold Cup at Badlands Motor Speedway was removed from the World of Outlaws schedule after failing to meet sanctioning negotiations.

References

World of Outlaws Sprint Car seasons
World of Outlaws Sprint Car Series
World of Outlaws Sprint Car Series